In organic chemistry, a lactol is the cyclic equivalent of a hemiacetal or a hemiketal.
The compound is formed by the intramolecular nucleophilic addition of a hydroxyl group to the carbonyl group of an aldehyde or a ketone.

A lactol is often found as an equilibrium mixture with the corresponding hydroxyaldehyde. The equilibrium can favor either direction depending on ring size and other conformational effects.

The lactol functional group is prevalent in nature as component of aldose sugars.

Chemical reactivity

Lactols can participate in a variety of chemical reactions including:
 Oxidation to form lactones
 Reaction with alcohols to form acetals
 The reaction of sugars with alcohols or other nucleophiles leads to the formation of glycosides
 Reduction (deoxygenation) to form cyclic ethers

References

Functional groups